Yang Jingyu (February 13, 1905 – February 23, 1940), born Ma Shangde, was a Chinese Communist, commander-in-chief and political commissar of the First Route Army of the Northeast Anti-Japanese United Army, in the guerrilla war in Manchuria against the Japanese campaign to pacify Manchukuo during the Second Sino-Japanese War.

Early life 

Yang was born in Queshan, Henan (today a suburb of Zhumadian prefectural-level city) to a local farmer's family. He had both classic education in his village private school and in a modern school in Queshan when young. Yang was influenced by the New Cultural Movement after he became disappointed with the post-revolutionary warlordism. He went to college in Kaifeng, the then capital of Henan Province. In 1925, he joined the Chinese Communist Youth League in Kaifeng where he pursued his higher education and then became a member of the Communist Party of China.  After the Autumn Harvest Uprising he organized local farmers in Queshan into a Revolutionary Armed Force unit. Later he did other underground work in Xinyang, Kaifeng, and Luoyang.

In 1929, he was dispatched to northeast China, where he held a post as the Communist Party of China Fushun special branch secretary. Imprisoned by the Japanese and then by the regime of Zhang Xueliang, he was rescued during the chaos following the Mukden Incident. After the rescue from prison, he successively held a leading position for the offices of Harbin district party committee secretary, municipal party committee secretary, and Manchurian Acting provincial party committee secretary of the Central Military Commission.

In 1932, he set up the Chinese Workers' and Peasants' Red Army 32nd Army as a guerrilla force, and Panshi in Jilin province as his guerrilla base.

In September, 1933 he was appointed commander-in-chief and political commissar of the Independent Division of the First Army of the Northeastern People's Revolutionary Army. In 1934, the Independent Division became the First Army of the Northeast People's Revolutionary Army, with Yang as commander-in-chief of the army and the Anti-Japanese United Front Army Headquarters.

In February 1936, Yang was appointed Northeast Anti-Japanese United Army First Army commander and political commissar, in June he was appointed Northeast Anti-Japanese United Army First Route Army commander-in-chief concurrently political commissar. Zhou Baozhong commanded the 2nd Route Army, and Li Zhaolin the 3rd Route Army. This army was open to all who wanted to resist the Japanese invasion and proclaimed its willingness to ally with all other anti-Japanese forces. This policy won over some of the shanlin bands, including former National Salvation Army units. After the Marco Polo Bridge Incident a number of Manchukuoan troops deserted to the Anti-Japanese Army.

Resistance 
The Northeast Anti-Japanese United Army conducted a protracted campaign which threatened the stability of the Manchukuo regime and the Japanese colonial rule, especially during 1936 and 1937. By the beginning of 1937, it comprised eleven corps in three armies, estimated by the Japanese to be about 20,000 men. Lacking the troops and materiel to conduct full-scale conventional warfare, the army's strategies were primarily to form pockets of resistance in occupied areas to harass the Japanese troops and undermine their attempts at local administration, and to launch small surprise attacks to divert resources from Japan's advance into China Proper or against the Soviet Union after the border clashes of Chengkufeng (1938) and Battle of Khalkhin Gol (1939).

Yang twice commanded western marches that threatened Japanese lines of communication to Tieling and Fushun in Liaoning Province. From the latter half of 1938, Japan concentrated large numbers of its troops in Manchukuo with the mission of encircling Yang's army and placed a 10,000-yuan bounty on his head. By September 1938, the Japanese estimated that the Anti-Japanese Army was reduced to 10,000 men.

By 1940, the war was stalemated although Japan held most of the Manchurian coastal areas and the open country along the railroads, small forces of Chinese guerrillas fought doggedly on from the mountains and woodlands. The Kwantung Army then brought reinforcements into the Northeast with a plan for "maintaining order and mopping up anti-Japanese elements." They cut off the supply lines to the troops of the United Front, the Chinese soldiers persevered, frequently launching attacks that compelled the enemy to divert its main force from punitive expeditions against the Chinese forces.

Last stand 
Yang led more than 40 engagements in Jilin Province, despite critically lacking supplies. In response, the Japanese committed a scorched earth strategy by routinely looting rural harvests, confiscating food from villages, and forcefully segregating civilians into "lawful settlements," in the attempt of depriving the resistance any means of supply. Large collaborationist patrols were also frequently deployed to inflict attrition on the guerrillas.

Yang and his men were closely encircled by 40,000 Japanese troops in January to mid-February 1940. Facing a dire situation, he organized his forces to disperse into small units and break out of the encirclement. His detachment of 60 troopers were betrayed to the Japanese by a staff officer on February 18. After the last two soldiers at his side were killed in action, Yang continued fighting alone for another 5 days. He was eventually cornered in a small forest by a large combined Japanese and collaborationist forces in the Mengjiang County, and was killed during fierce fighting by multiple shots from machineguns. It was reported that the Japanese troops, fearing Yang's famed marksmanship from previous encounters, refused to approach his body for a while after his death.

Unable to understand Yang's source of perseverance (Yang had not eaten for over 6 days), the Japanese ordered an autopsy after cutting off and preserving Yang's head. When they cut open Yang's stomach, they found only tree bark, cotton batting and grass roots within — not a single grain of rice. The Japanese commander at the scene, Ryuichiro Kishitani, was so shocked at the revelation that he "went silent, and appeared aged a lot within the next day." Kishitani committed seppuku after Japan's defeat, but wrote in his will that "His Majesty might be wrong in launching this war. China has steely soldiers like Yang Jingyu, and it would not fall."

After Yang's death 
The Japanese initially buried Yang's beheaded body carelessly in the wild. It was then rumored that the Japanese commander-in-chief in the area, General Shōtoku Nozoe, was having nightmares and feared it was Yang's ghost. Panicked, Kishitani ordered his men to rebury the body properly with full cemetery ritual and military respect, honoring Yang — though an enemy — "a true warrior."

Yang's death was a great blow to his remaining troops, who turned their sorrow into anger. Over the next few months, Japanese forces increased their attacks and forced many of Yang's followers out into isolated areas in Manchuria or the Far Eastern territories of the Soviet Union.

After the end of the Second World War, Yang's severed head was recovered by the Communist forces, rejoined to his body, and reburied with full military honor. Mengjiang County was also renamed to Jingyu County in his memory.

References

External links 
Yang Jingyu
A Look Back: The Anti Japanese War
The volunteer armies of northeast China

1905 births
1940 deaths
Hui people
Chinese military personnel killed in World War II
Chinese Communist Party politicians from Henan
Politicians from Zhumadian
Republic of China politicians from Henan
Snipers
Chinese guerrillas